Cychropsis janetscheki is a species of ground beetle in the subfamily of Carabinae. It was described by Mandl in 1970.

References

janetscheki
Beetles described in 1970